Too Late is a 2000 Portuguese film directed by José Nascimento. The script is based on a true story. It was Portugal's submission to the 73rd Academy Awards for the Academy Award for Best Foreign Language Film, but was not accepted as a nominee.

See also

Cinema of Portugal
List of submissions to the 73rd Academy Awards for Best Foreign Language Film

References

External links

2000 films
Films directed by José Nascimento
Portuguese drama films